Jón Thoroddsen may refer to:

Jón Thoroddsen elder (c. 1818–1868)
Jón Thoroddsen junior (1898–1924)